Milton Pringle Whitehead (1862 - August 15, 1901) was a Major League Baseball player who played shortstop in . He would play for the St. Louis Maroons and Kansas City Cowboys.

External links

1862 births
1901 deaths
19th-century baseball players
Baseball players from Toronto
Canadian expatriate baseball players in the United States
Major League Baseball shortstops
Major League Baseball players from Canada
St. Louis Maroons players
Kansas City Cowboys (UA) players
Leadville Blues players
Kansas City Cowboys (minor league) players
Topeka Capitals players
Memphis Grays players
Leavenworth Soldiers players
Hastings Hustlers players
Stockton (minor league baseball) players
Denver Grizzlies (baseball) players
Denver Mountaineers players
San Francisco Friscos players
San Francisco Metropolitans players
Omaha Lambs players
St. Paul Apostles players
Duluth Whalebacks players
Portland Gladiators players
Oakland Colonels players
Stockton River Pirates players
Sacramento Senators players
Binghamton Bingoes players
Allentown Buffaloes players
Nashville Tigers players
Troy Washerwomen players
Scranton Indians players
Scranton Coal Heavers players
Rochester Browns players